Jeanne-Le Ber was a federal electoral district in Quebec, Canada, that was represented in the House of Commons of Canada from 2004 to 2015. Its population in 2006 was 112,863. It was abolished for the 2015 election and dissolved into Ville-Marie—Le Sud-Ouest—Île-des-Sœurs and LaSalle—Émard—Verdun.

Geography
The district included the Borough of Verdun, along with the neighbourhoods of Saint-Henri, Little Burgundy, and Pointe-Saint-Charles and the eastern part of Côte-Saint-Paul, in the Southwest borough. It was named for Jeanne Le Ber, a religious recluse and craftswoman who lived in Pointe-Saint-Charles in the 18th century.

Political geography
Until 2011, the Bloc Québécois was strongest in Verdun, Saint-Henri and Point-Saint-Charles while the Liberal Party of Canada prevailed in Nuns' Island and Little Burgundy. However, in 2011 the NDP swept nearly every poll in the borough.

Demographics
Average family income: $57,496  (2001) 
Median household income: $31,386 
Unemployment:    9.8% 
Language, Mother Tongue: French 65%, English 19%, Other 16% 
Religion: Catholic 70%, Protestant 9%, Muslim 4%, Other Christian 2%, Orthodox Christian 1%, Buddhist 1%, Jewish 1%, Hindu 1%, Other 1%, No Religious Affiliation 12%.  
Visible Minority: Black 5%, Chinese 3%, South Asian 2%, Arab 2%, Latin American 2%, Others 2%, Southeast Asian 1%.

History
The riding was created in 2003 from the ridings of Verdun—Saint-Henri—Saint-Paul—Pointe Saint-Charles and Westmount—Ville-Marie; essentially the area of Little Burgundy and Griffintown were transferred from Westmount—Ville-Marie to Verdun—Saint-Henri—Saint-Paul—Pointe Saint-Charles.

Members of Parliament

This riding has elected the following Members of Parliament:

Election results

|-

Change is from redistributed votes from the 2000 election. Conservative change is based on a combination of Canadian Alliance and Progressive Conservative votes.

See also
 List of Canadian federal electoral districts
 Past Canadian electoral districts

References

Campaign expense data from Elections Canada
Riding history from the  Library of Parliament

Notes

Former federal electoral districts of Quebec
Verdun, Quebec
Le Sud-Ouest